Excluding the northernmost districts, Kazakhstan consists of endorheic basins, where rivers flow into one of the numerous lakes. The most important drainage system is known as Yedisu, meaning "seven rivers" in Turkic languages. Below is the list of the more important lakes, some of which are shared (Caspian Sea, Lake Aral, Lake Aike, etc.) with the neighbouring countries.

See also
Sor (geomorphology)

References 

Lakes
Kazakhstan